Tangkoko Batuangus Nature Reserve also known as Tangkoko-Batuangus Dua Saudara is a nature reserve in the northern part of Sulawesi island of Indonesia, two hours drive from Manado. The reserve covers an area of 8,700 hectares and includes three mountains: Mount Tangkoko (1,109 meters), Mount Dua Saudara (1,361 meters) and Mount Batuangus (450 meters).

Flora and fauna
The most common trees in the lowland rainforest of the park are species of the Palaquium genus,  Cananga odorata and Dracontomelon dao.

Tangkoko Batuangus Nature Reserve protects at least 127 mammal, 233 bird and 104 reptile and amphibian species. Of these 79 mammal, 103 bird and 29 reptile and amphibian species are endemic to the island.

Threatened mammals include the Celebes crested macaque, of which about 5,500 remain on the island, spectral tarsier, Sulawesi bear cuscus and Sulawesi dwarf cuscus. Birds include the knobbed hornbill, Sulawesi hornbill and maleo.

Conservation and threats
The first conservation area at Mount Tongkoko has been established in 1919. To this the Duasaudara area has been added in 1978, and the Batuangus and Batuputih areas in 1981, together encompassing a total of 8,718 hectares. Visitation is only allowed in the Batuputih area.

Several Indonesian and international environmental organisations are involved with the conservation of the reserve, including Sulut Bosami, Wildlife Conservation Society and Tarantula.

Habitat destruction and hunting pose serious threats to the reserve. As result of hunting, between 1978 and 1993 the number of crested macaques declined by 75%, maleo birds by 90% and bear cuscus by 95%. A survey of the three surrounding villages conducted in 2005 found that while the most frequently hunted species were rats, locals still hunted for macaques and cuscus both for meat and to be sold on the market.

See also
Protected areas of Indonesia
CITES

References

External links

Bitung
Protected areas of Indonesia
Protected areas established in 1981
1981 establishments in Indonesia
Geography of North Sulawesi 
Tourist attractions in North Sulawesi